Dalandanan National High School is a secondary school in Valenzuela City. It is found in Dalandanan, Valenzuela City, Metro Manila.

References 

Division of City Schools–Valenzuela
Department of Education of the Philippines

High schools in Metro Manila
Schools in Valenzuela, Metro Manila
Educational institutions established in 1995
Public schools in Metro Manila
1995 establishments in the Philippines